Finnegan may refer to:

Media
 "Finnegan's Wake", a street ballad
 Finnegans Wake, a 1939 book by James Joyce

Characters
 Finnegan (Star Trek), a minor fictional character in Star Trek
 Finnegan, the dog puppet from the Mr. Dressup television show

Other
 Finnegan (surname), including a list of people with the name
 Finnegan, Alberta, an unincorporated community in Canada
 Finnegan Foundation, Pennsylvania education organization
 Finnegan, Henderson, Farabow, Garrett & Dunner, intellectual property law firm
 USS Finnegan (DE-307), Evarts-class U.S. destroyer escort

See also
 Finnigan